The Triangle Lake Round Barn, located west of Eugene, Oregon, was built between 1946 and 1949, and added to the National Register of Historic Places on July 3 2017.

See also
 National Register of Historic Places listings in Lane County, Oregon

References

1949 establishments in Oregon
Barns on the National Register of Historic Places in Oregon
Buildings and structures completed in 1949
National Register of Historic Places in Lane County, Oregon
Round barns in Oregon